Liam Gormley (born 19 March 1993), is a Scottish professional footballer who plays for Rutherglen Glencairn in the West of Scotland Football League. He has previously appeared in the Scottish Football League First Division for Greenock Morton.

Career
As a youngster at Motherwell, Gormley was called up to the Scotland U16 squad for the 2008 Victory Shield, making two appearances. The following year, he also played twice for the U17's and moved to Celtic to sign his first professional contract. Despite winning numerous honours at youth level, including the 2010–11 Scottish Youth Cup where he scored the decisive goal in the final against Rangers in front of 9,427 fans at Hampden Park, Gormley did not make a first-team appearance at Celtic and was released in the summer of 2012.

Gormley had trials at Birmingham City and Greenock Morton at the start of the 2012–13 season, and made one league appearance for the Cappielow club against Raith Rovers in September 2012. He later joined East Fife on a permanent basis, scoring on his debut against Albion Rovers in November 2012. A new contract offer was withdrawn at the beginning of the following season and Gormley eventually signed for Queen's Park in September 2013, again scoring on his debut.

A two-year stint in the Lowland Football League with East Kilbride, included a run to the fifth round of the 2015–16 Scottish Cup where Gormley faced former club Celtic. After leaving East Kilbride, Gormley signed briefly with Junior side, Kilbirnie Ladeside before joining Cambuslang Rangers in September 2016. Gormley joined 'Langs local rivals Rutherglen Glencairn in September 2017.

References

1993 births
Living people
Scottish footballers
Association football forwards
Scotland youth international footballers
Celtic F.C. players
East Fife F.C. players
Queen's Park F.C. players
East Kilbride F.C. players
Kilbirnie Ladeside F.C. players
Cambuslang Rangers F.C. players
Rutherglen Glencairn F.C. players
Scottish Professional Football League players
Scottish Junior Football Association players
Lowland Football League players